This is a list of dishes found in Hungarian cuisine.

Soups and stews

Meat dishes

Dumplings and others

Breads and pancakes

Sweets and cakes

See also

 List of restaurants in Hungary
 Hungarian cuisine

References

Lists of foods by nationality
Dishes